Ceritoturris nataliae is a species of sea snail, a marine gastropod mollusk in the family Horaiclavidae.

It was formerly included within the subfamily Crassispirinae of the family Turridae.

Description
The length of the shell attains 5.2 mm, its diameter 1.9 mm.

Distribution
This marine species was found on the continental shelf of Natal and Zululand, South Africa at depths between 50 m and 90 m.

References

 Kilburn, R. N. "Turridae (Mollusca: Gastropoda) of southern Africa and Mozambique. Part 4. Subfamilies Drilliinae, Crassispirinae and Strictispirinae." Annals of the Natal Museum 29.1 (1988): 167–320.
  Tucker, J.K. 2004 Catalog of recent and fossil turrids (Mollusca: Gastropoda). Zootaxa 682:1-1295.

Endemic fauna of South Africa
nataliae
Gastropods described in 1988